The 2000–01 NBA season was the Rockets' 34th season in the National Basketball Association, and 30th season in the city of Houston. The Rockets had the ninth pick in the 2000 NBA draft, and selected Joel Przybilla from the University of Minnesota, but soon traded him to the Milwaukee Bucks in exchange for rookie center Jason Collier. In an effort to shore up their front line, the Rockets signed free agent Maurice Taylor during the off-season. After the retirement of Charles Barkley, the Rockets got off to a 13–9 start to the season, but then went on a six-game losing streak afterwards. The team held a 25–25 record at the All-Star break, and then played above .500 for the remainder of the season. However, the Rockets missed the playoffs despite finishing fifth in the Midwest Division with a winning record of 45–37, which was two games behind the 8th-seeded Minnesota Timberwolves.

Second-year star Steve Francis continued to emerge as the new star of the Rockets, averaging 19.9 points, 6.9 rebounds, 6.5 assists and 1.8 steals per game, while Cuttino Mobley averaged 19.5 points and 5.0 rebounds per game, and Taylor provided the team with 13.0 points and 5.5 rebounds per game. In addition, Hakeem Olajuwon contributed 11.9 points, 7.4 rebounds and 1.5 blocks per game, but only played 58 games due to a blood condition in his left leg, while Shandon Anderson provided with 8.7 points per game, Walt Williams contributed 8.3 points per game, and second-year forward Kenny Thomas averaged 7.1 points and 5.6 rebounds per game.

This season also marked an end of an era as Olajuwon was traded to the Toronto Raptors following the season, after seventeen seasons with the Rockets. Also following the season, Anderson was traded to the New York Knicks, while Carlos Rogers signed as a free agent with the Indiana Pacers, and three-point specialist Matt Bullard signed with the Charlotte Hornets.

Draft picks

Roster

Regular season

Season standings

z – clinched division title
y – clinched division title
x – clinched playoff spot

Record vs. opponents

Game log

Player statistics

Season

Awards and records

Transactions

References

See also
2000–01 NBA season

Houston Rockets seasons